Nana Nuriana (born 17 April 1938) is an Indonesian former military officer who also served as the Governor of West Java for two terms between 1993 and 2003. His tenure as governor saw the secession of Banten as its own province.

Early life and military career
Nuriana was born in Sumedang on 17 April 1938. He graduated from the Indonesian Military Academy in 1962, and his first position in the armed forces was as a military district (rayon) commander. After graduating from high school, he studied geology at the Bandung Institute of Technology, but he did not complete his studies there. Instead, he enrolled at the Indonesian Military Academy, graduating in 1962. Out from the academy, he became a second lieutenant in the Indonesian Army, and was posted at a batallion in Cimahi as a military district (rayon) commander. After gradually rising up the military ranks, Nuriana became the commander of the West Java-based Kodam III/Siliwangi in 1991. Immediately prior to that, he had been chief of staff of Kodam VII/Wirabuana, headquartered in Makassar.

As governor

On 22 May 1993, Nuriana was sworn in as the governor of West Java after his election by the provincial council with 68 of 99 votes. At that time, he held the rank of major general. When he ran for reelection in 1998, the Reformasi movement was in full swing, and his candidacy was challenged with sixteen potential gubernatorial candidates (Nuriana included) running for the office. Despite this, Nuriana still managed to win reelection with 70 out of 96 votes. He was sworn in for his second term on 8 August 1998.

During his second term, Nuriana faced a secessionist movement from Banten, with Banten's local politicians and figures wanting to form a separate province. Nuriana opposed this movement, as he feared that Banten's secession would reduce the revenue base of West Java. He also argued against the secessionists, claiming that the West Java government had made substantial investments in developing regions in Banten such as the cities of Serang and Tangerang in addition to rural regions. However, Nuriana was politically weakened at that point, with several ongoing corruption investigations against him. Banten eventually seceded as a separate province in 2000.

Later career
After the end of his tenure as governor, he was investigated for corruption charges by the Provincial Prosecution Service in 2001, and later by the Corruption Eradication Commission in 2006 and 2009.

References

1938 births
Living people
People from Sumedang Regency
Indonesian generals
Governors of West Java